Kornədi (also, Körnədi and Kornady) is a village and municipality in the Lerik Rayon of Azerbaijan.  It has a population of 225.

References 

Populated places in Lerik District